Baoshan Town is a town located on the northwestern portion of Huairou District, Beijing, China. It shares border with Yangmuzhazi Township and Labagoumen Manchu Ethnic Tonwship in its north, Tanghekou Town in its east, Liulimiao Town and Zhenzhuquan Township in its south, as well as Qianjiadian and Dongmao Towns in its west. According to the 2020 census, it had a total population of 6,246. The name Baoshan translates to "Treasure Mountain".

History

Administrative divisions 
By 2021, Baoshan Town administered the following 25 villages:

See also 

 List of township-level divisions of Beijing

References 

Huairou District
Towns in Beijing